Albany Academy for Girls is an independent college-preparatory day school for girls in Albany, New York, United States, enrolling students from Preschool (age 3) to Grade 12. Founded in 1814 by Ebenezer Foote as the Albany Female Academy, AAG is the oldest independent girls day school in the United States.  It is located on the corners of Hackett Boulevard and Academy Road, across the street from its brother school The Albany Academy.

In July 2007, the administrative teams of The Albany Academy and Albany Academy for Girls merged into The Albany Academies. Both schools bring with them deeply treasured values of community, tradition and purpose to the newly formed institution known as The Albany Academies. However, The Albany Academy and Albany Academy for Girls continue to grant their own diplomas.

Collaboration with The Albany Academy
The Board of Trustees announced that The Albany Academy and Albany Academy for Girls would merge into The Albany Academies in July 2007. Single-gender education will continue under the present form in Lower and Middle Schools, while Upper School students may continue to cross-register for coed classes and certain extracurricular activities. On July 1, 2009, the Board of Trustees announced the appointment of Douglas M. North AA'58, President of Alaska Pacific University, to the position of Head of School of The Albany Academies, effective July 2010.

Accreditation and memberships
The Albany Academies are accredited by the New York State Association of Independent Schools and recognized by the Regents of the State of New York. The Albany Academies are a member of the following associations: the College Board, the Cum Laude Society, the National Association of Independent Schools, the Educational Records Bureau, the Capital Region Independent Schools Association, the Association of Boys' Schools, the Secondary Schools Admission Test Board, and the New England Prep School Athletic Association.

Alumnae
Notable alumnae include:
Anne Lynch Botta, poet, author, teacher, socialite
Magdalene Isadora La Grange, poet
Mary Gardiner Horsford, poet
Mary Blanchard Lynde, philanthropist and social reformer
Jane Stanford, co-founder of Stanford University alongside her husband Leland Stanford
Elise Stefanik, politician
Rev. Caroline Soule, first woman ordained in the UK
Harriet Mabel Spalding, litterateur, poet

Faculty/administration
John Chester, second president of Rensselaer Polytechnic Institute
John Ely, U.S. Representative from New York
Doris Grumbach, novelist, biographer, literary critic, and essayist
Eben Norton Horsford, chemist and Viking enthusiast
Caroline B. Mason, educator, the only person in the United States to head two schools simultaneously
Anne Montgomery, RSCJ, non-violent activist and educator

In media
In The Official Preppy Handbook, edited by Lisa Birnbach, an Albany Academy for Girls admissions pamphlet is pictured among others in a section titled "Preparing to Prep: Picking the School for You"

External links

References

1814 establishments in New York (state)
Education in Albany, New York
Educational institutions established in 1814
Girls' schools in New York (state)
Preparatory schools in New York (state)
Private schools in Capital District (New York)
Private K-12 schools in New York (state)
Private high schools in Albany County, New York
Organizations based in Albany, New York